The Handalan class are domestically modified Spica-M fast attack craft, a heavier variant of the . Built by Kalskrona Varvet and ordered in 1976, this class replaced the Perkasa-class squadron on a 1:1 basis, including name transfer.

Development

The Handalans are equipped with longer-range diesel engines and an additional weapons fit with launchers for Exocet MM38 missiles and a secondary Bofors 40 mm gun. The installation of additional weaponry from the main Bofors 57 mm gun forced the bridge to be pushed forward to accept the missile launchers and additional rear gun.  With a data-link communications system, the class allows the exchange of information through computers with similar equipment, both other ships and shore-based stations. They also have elaborate countermeasures with a Thales DR3000S, electronic tracking equipment and weapon control systems.  In all, the Handalans are more capable and better armed than the larger Perdana-class missile boat of the Royal Malaysian Navy. In late 2020 Royal Malaysian Navy confirmed that this class of ship will be upgrade to lengthening service period of older ships.

Ships of the class

Bibliography

References

Missile boat classes
Naval ships of Malaysia
Ships built in Karlskrona
Malaysia–Sweden relations